Black Mountain Rag is the title of a recording by American folk music and country blues artists Doc Watson and Merle Watson, released in 2006. It contains songs taken from albums that Doc and Merle recorded on the Flying Fish label in the 1980s.

A 1990 trio bonus track of "Blackberry Blossom" with Doc, Norman Blake and Tony Rice is included.

Reception

Writing for Allmusic, music critic Steve Leggett wrote of the album "... what is immediately striking about this compilation is how varied it is, even as it settles nicely into familiar 'Watson country.' Again, there's no such thing as a bad Doc Watson album, and this one, like all the others, shows why he's a true national treasure."

Track listing
 "Black Mountain Rag" (Traditional) – 2:42
 "Smoke, Smoke, Smoke" (Merle Travis, Tex Williams) – 2:47
 "Black Pine Waltz" (Traditional) – 2:34
 "Red Rocking Chair" (Traditional, Watson) – 2:06
 "Twinkle, Twinkle" (Traditional) – 3:04
 "Below Freezing" (Coleman) – 2:20
 "Mole in the Ground" (Traditional) – 2:30
 "Liza/Lady Be Good" (George Gershwin, Ira Gershwin, Gus Kahn) – 2:56
 "Down Yonder" (Traditional) – 2:23
 "Cotton Row"  (Traditional) – 2:47
 "Sadie" (T. Michael Coleman, Byron Hill) – 2:30
 "Leaving London" (Tom Paxton) – 2:32
 "Guitar Polka" (Dexter, Paris) – 2:22
 "Fisher's Hornpipe/Devil's Dream" (Traditional) – 1:44
 "Along the Road" (Dan Fogelberg) – 2:52
 "Bye Bye Bluebelle/Smiles" (Travis) – 2:13
 "Sheeps in the Meadow/Stoney Fork" (Traditional) – 2:53
 "Take Me Out to the Ball Game" (Jack Norworth, Albert Von Tilzer) – 2:17
 "Blackberry Blossom" (Traditional) – 3:15
 "Gonna Lay Down My Old Guitar" (Alton Delmore, Rabon Delmore) – 2:31

Personnel
Doc Watson – vocals, guitar, banjo, harmonica
Merle Watson – guitar, dobro, banjo, slide guitar
T. Michael Coleman – bass, harmony vocals
Herb Pedersen – harmony vocals
Mark O'Connor – fiddle, mandolin
Tony Rice – guitar
Norman Blake – mandolin
Ron Tutt – drums
Gene Estes – percussion
Hank "Bones" Kahn – bones
Al Perkins – pedal steel guitar
Charlie Musselwhite – harmonica
Byron Berline – fiddle
Tom Scott – clarinet
Pat McInerney – drums, percussion
Production notes
Hank Cicalo – engineer
Ernie Winfrey – engineer
Bill Wolf – engineer
Jonathan Wyner – mastering

References

2006 compilation albums
Doc Watson compilation albums
Rounder Records compilation albums